James Stewart (1763-4 August 1828) was  British colonialist, slave owner, soldier and politician. He was elected to the House of Assembly of Jamaica in 1820 for the parish of Saint Andrew.

Family life
He inherited Stewart Castle in Trelawney Parish, Jamaica from his father, known locally as James Stewart I.
He was the grandfather of Stewart Campbell the Canadian politician.

He is buried in the graveyard of Falmouth Parish Church of St. Peter.

Political career
Stewart was the Custos for Trelawney Parish 1800-1821. In this capacity he was one of the Commissioners who established Stewart Town, near the border of Trelawney Parish with Saint Ann Parish. He was also a lieutenant colonel in the Jamaica Militia in which capacity he played a prominent role in the Second Maroon War (1795-6) leading the third column of the Trelawney militia.

Author?
Views differ as to whether Stewart was in fact the author of A Brief account of the Present State of the Negroes in Jamaica written under the name of James Stewart and published in Bath in 1792.

References

External links 

Members of the House of Assembly of Jamaica
1763 births
1828 deaths